is a collection of seventy short stories written by Inagaki Taruho. Fully published in 1923, the tales do not necessarily connect and are written in a fantastical nature, often presenting completely impossible situations and actions.

The stories
Each short tale is written in a way that defies basic reasoning and logic. For example, a running theme throughout the stories is the narrator's constant conflict with the character Mr. Moon, the personification of the Moon, who has been given several human qualities including the ability to walk, talk, and even fight with his fists. Often the black narrator will retaliate against Mr. Moon by shooting at him with his water pistol. Other times, the narrator will encounter shooting stars that have fallen out of the sky or have been knocked out of their flight by a thrown rock. After close inspection, the narrator deems the stars are junk and proceeds to throw them into the trash.

The stories seem to lack both a plot and an easily followable or connecting narrative. There is no pattern for the length of the stories as they can comprise anything from a few short words of conversation to an entire two pages of text.

Titles
Each of the seventy stories was given its own title in Japanese and was later translated into English. However some of the titles, such as Un Mémoire and Un Chanson ďEnfants are translated into French, adding to the general absence of order or pattern of any kind in the book.

Understanding the text
Though lacking any logical setup or rational story, Inagaki attempts to defend the purpose of the tales with one very short story entitled Un Énigme:

-

-"Huh?"

-

-"Whadya say?"

-

-"Say, whadya mean?"

-

The last line of the short story, nonsense i say has a value, is widely believed to be Inagaki's own statement about the stories he has created, and the meaning, although seemingly devoid, they contain.

References 
 

1923 short story collections
Fantasy short story collections